Wayne Black and Kevin Ullyett were the defending champions, but lost in the quarterfinals to Mahesh Bhupati and Max Mirnyi.

Mahesh Bhupati and Max Mirnyi won the title, defeating Jiří Novák and Radek Štěpánek in the final, 6–3, 3–6, 6–4.

Seeds

  Mark Knowles /  Daniel Nestor (quarterfinals)
  Donald Johnson /  Jared Palmer (quarterfinals)
  Mahesh Bhupathi /  Max Mirnyi (champions)
  Jonas Björkman /  Todd Woodbridge (semifinals)
  Wayne Black /  Kevin Ullyett (quarterfinals)
  Bob Bryan /  Mike Bryan (semifinals)
  Martin Damm /  Cyril Suk (first round)
  Joshua Eagle /  Sandon Stolle (first round)
  Yevgeny Kafelnikov /  Paul Haarhuis (third round)
  Ellis Ferreira /  David Rikl (second round)
  Jiří Novák /  Radek Štěpánek (final)
  Julien Boutter /  Sjeng Schalken (second round)
  Michael Hill /  Leander Paes (second round)
  Brian MacPhie /  Nenad Zimonjić (third round)
  Robbie Koenig /  David Prinosil (third round)
  David Adams /  Gastón Etlis (first round)

Draw

Finals

Top half

Section 1

Section 2

Bottom half

Section 3

Section 4

External links
 Main draw
2002 US Open – Men's draws and results at the International Tennis Federation

2002 US Open (tennis)
US Open (tennis) by year – Men's doubles